Devhare is in Mandangad taluka about 210 km from Mumbai by road.  All state transport buses go through the Devhare.  Devhare is scenic and surrounded with hills.  The normal temperature of Devhare is around 26 °C. In month of April and may go around 42 degrees.  Devhare is relatively undiscovered as a tourist destination.  The Scenic beach of Kelshi is about 15 km from Devhare.  A ferry from Bankot can take you to Harihareshwar and Shriwardhan, the ferry ride is very scenic.

Marathi is the common language here. Some people also know Hindi and English.

All the festivals are celebrated with great enthusiasm and a spirit of togetherness. Gauri Ganapati and Magh Chaturthi are the most important events in the entire Konkan region. Holi, Gudi Padva and Diwali are well celebrated here, too.

Since Konkan is a pilgrimage destination, non - vegetarian food is a little rare. But on the outskirts of devhare fish curry, rice and kokam kadhi are available. Vegetable curries are also very tasty, prepared with a coconut base. "Modak", the favorite sweet meat of Lord Ganesh, is also available.

The Konkan coast is rich in horticulture with delicious exotic fruits, particularly the Ratnagiri "Happoos" mangoes. These are also turned into sweet preparations like Ambapoli and Phanaspoli (pancakes of dried mango and jackfruit respectively).

Attractions 

 Devhare swayamboo shankar mandir: The swayamboo mandir of lord shiva is famous for ancient sculptures and rock cut monuments. The surrounding area of mandir is full of greenery and is peaceful.
 Durgadi Hill is famous for its magnified height. You must see all places in devhare through Durgadi Hill.
 hanuman mandir it is also great attraction of devhare.
 In devhare there are 8 well, 4 lack, and 3 big dam.

Climate 
The coastal climate is mostly hot and humid but it is healthy and devoid of pollution.  The temperature is at its peak (around 38 °C) in the month of March.  The monsoon season is between June and October.  The rains are regular here.  The climate is pleasant in winter and the temperature often falls at night.

Villages in Ratnagiri district